Steviopsis is a genus of Mexican plants in the tribe Eupatorieae within the family Asteraceae.

Description
Members of Steviopsis are perennial herbs that have heads composed entirely of disk flowers, a pappus of capillary bristles, narrow corollas with spreading lobes, and glands on the cypselae (achenes).  The base chromosome number is x=10, which distinguishes it in part from the morphologically similar Brickellia.  The genus is endemic to Mexico.

Taxonomy
The genus was originally described by King and Robinson as part of the splitting of Eupatorium into monophyletic units.  The distinctiveness and circumscription of the genus were recently assessed using molecular phylogenetic approaches 

 Species
 Steviopsis amblyolepis (B.L.Rob.) R.M.King & H.Rob. - Guerrero, Morelos, Michoacán
 Steviopsis arsenei R.M.King & H.Rob. - Michoacán
 Steviopsis dryophila (B.L.Rob.) B.L.Turner - Jalisco, Nayarit, Zacatecas, Sinaloa
 Steviopsis nesomii B.L.Turner - Nuevo León
 Steviopsis rapunculoides (DC.) R.M.King & H.Rob. - Jalisco, Guanajuato, Nayarit, Morelos, Michoacán
 Steviopsis vigintiseta (DC.) R.M.King & H.Rob. - Oaxaca, Puebla, Morelos, México State

 formerly included
see Asanthus Brickelliastrum Dyscritogyne

References

Eupatorieae
Asteraceae genera
Endemic flora of Mexico